Karol Beck and Jaroslav Levinský won in the final 6–3, 6–3, against Rajeev Ram and Bobby Reynolds and they became the first champions of this tournament.

Seeds

Draw

Draw

References
 Doubles Draw

Aegean Tennis Cup - Doubles
Ixian Grand Aegean Tennis Cup